This is a list of the complete squads for the 2014 Six Nations Championship, an annual rugby union tournament contested by the national rugby teams of England, France, Ireland, Italy, Scotland and Wales. Wales are the defending champions.

Note: Number of caps and players' ages are indicated as of 1 February 2014 – the tournament's opening day.

On 9 January, England announced their 35-man Squad for the 2014 Six Nations Championship, including 5 uncapped players.

Head coach:  Stuart Lancaster
 Caps updated: 15 January 2014

Call-ups
On 2 February, Freddie Burns was added to the squad for the Scotland match in round 2.

On 16 February, David Wilson was added to the squad to replace the injured Dan Cole.

On 3 March, Manu Tuilagi and Marland Yarde was added to the squad for the round 4 clash with Wales.

On 6 January 2014, France named a 30-man squad for the 2014 Six Nations Championship. Additional players maybe added to the squad throughout the tournament due to the new selection formart the FFR uses during the Six Nations and End-of-year tests.

Head coach:  Philippe Saint-André
 Caps updated: 15 January 2014

Call-ups
On 20 January, Captain Thierry Dusautoir and Wing Sofiane Guitoune withdrew from the squad due to injury and were replaced by Virgile Bruni and Jean-Marcellin Buttin. Pascal Papé was named the new Captain. On 25 January, François Trinh-Duc was called up to the squad to cover Rémi Tales, who will miss the opening match against England due to injury.

On 10 February, Ibrahim Diarra and Alexandre Lapandry were added to the squad for the round 3 clash with Wales. In addition to Diarra and Lapandry, Marc Andreu, Vincent Debaty, Wenceslas Lauret and Brice Mach were also called up to the squad to face Wales.

On 24 February, Antonie Claassen, Rémi Lamerat and Morgan Parra were added to the squad for the final two rounds against Scotland and Ireland.

Following an injury Dimitri Szarzewski sustained while playing for his club, Guilhem Guirado was called up to the squad on the 2 March to replace Szarzewski for the clash against Scotland.

On 27 January 2014, Ireland announced an extended 34-man squad for the 2014 Six Nations Championship. Additional players could be added, as the first original 34-man squad was only named for the opening two fixtures; Scotland and Wales.

Head coach:  Joe Schmidt
 Caps updated: 15 January 2014

Call-ups
On 29 January, Isaac Boss was added to the squad to cover the injured Eoin Reddan who suffered from a calf injury in training.

On 17 February, Dave Kilcoyne and Donnacha Ryan were added to the squad to face England in round 3.

On 2 March, Robbie Diack, Richardt Strauss and Simon Zebo were called up into the squad that would play Italy in round 4.

On 9 January, Italy announced a 30-man squad for the 2014 Six Nations Championship, featuring 2 uncapped players, and the return of Mirco Bergamasco.

Head coach:  Jacques Brunel
 Caps updated: 15 January 2014

Call-ups
Francesco Minto was added to the squad on 21 January to cover the injured Marco Fuser who twisted his knee in the Heineken Cup. Matías Agüero was added to the squad to play Scotland to cover the injured Michele Rizzo.

On 3 March, George Biagi, Andrea Masi, Tito Tebaldi and Manoa Vosawai was added to the squad with Biagi replacing the injured Alessandro Zanni.

On January 15, Scotland announced a 36-man squad for the 2014 Six Nations Championship, including 2 uncapped players.

Head coach:  Scott Johnson (Interim)
 Caps updated: 15 January 2014

Call-ups
On 17 February, Jack Cuthbert was added to the squad to face Italy in round 3.

On 3 March, Euan Murray returned to the squad after recovering from an injury he sustained in January. Edinburgh half-back pairing Sean Kennedy and Harry Leonard was also invited to train with the squad ahead of the French match.

Ahead of the final round, Lee Jones and Richie Vernon were considered to play among the backs against Wales.

On 14 January, Wales named a 32-man squad for the 2014 Six Nations Championship

Head Coach:  Warren Gatland
 Caps Updated: 15 January 2014

Call-ups
On 20 January, Ryan Jones was withdrawn from the squad due to injury and was replaced with James King. Second rower Jake Ball, who is eligible to play for the Wales through his Welsh born father, was also added to the squad for Ian Evans.

References

2014
2014 Six Nations Championship